Aloisio Gardellini (August 4, 1759 in Rome – October 8, 1829) was an Italian editor and compiler of religious documents.

He wrote a collection of the decrees of the Congregation of Rites. Until 1587, the celebration of the Sacrifice of the Mass and the administration of the sacraments had been subject to regulations made by various popes. Necessarily, in the course of time, these regulations became somewhat confused by reason of overlapping, amplification, and abolition.

In 1587 Pope Sixtus V, in the Constitution Immensae aeterni Dei, called into being a body of cardinals, bishops, and clerics, whose work was to guard and guide the proper celebration of the liturgical offices.

A collection of papal regulations and congregational decrees was published in 1730 by John Baptist Pithonius, a Venetian priest, the title of his book being "Constitutiones pontificae et Romanorum Congregationum decisiones ad sacros Ritus spectantes". This work was somewhat imperfect, and it was not until 1807 that Gardellini published the first two volumes of his well-known collection of the decrees of the Congregation of Rites, to which was prefixed "Sacrorum rituum studiosis monitum". Three further volumes were published in 1816, and a sixth volume was brought out in 1819. This volume contained more recent decrees down to the date of publication, and also the Commentary on the Clementine Instruction regarding the devotion of the Forty Hours.

A new and corrected edition of Gardellini's work was published in 1827, and in this edition he included certain relevant statements given between the years 1558 and 1599.

Gardellini was appointed assessor of the Congregation of Rites.

Other editions of the decrees have been issued subsequently.

References

1759 births
1829 deaths
Italian editors